Matt Reid (born 17 July 1990) is an Australian professional tennis player. His highest ATP singles ranking is world No. 183, which he reached on 3 February 2014. His career high in doubles was at world No. 60 set on 11 September 2017.

Tennis career
As a junior, he was runner-up in the Wimbledon Boys Doubles in 2008 partnering Bernard Tomic.

He reached the second round of the Australian Open Men's Doubles in 2013 partnering Samuel Groth.

In 2013, Matt Reid made his Grand Slam main draw debut at Wimbledon after booking his spot through qualifying. He lost in round one in straight sets.

In February 2014, Reid won the Burnie Challenger, which increased his ranking to a career high of 183.

ATP career finals

Doubles: 1 (1 runner-up)

Challenger and Futures finals

Singles: 16 (7–9)

Doubles: 55 (31–24)

Performance timelines

Singles

Doubles
Current through the 2022 Open 13.

Personal life

Reid previously dated Australian actress Rebel Wilson.

References

External links
 
 
 

1990 births
Living people
Australian male tennis players
Tennis players from Sydney